Mirzayev Jalal Sabir oglu is Azerbaijani diplomat, serving as the Ambassador of Azerbaijan to Indonesia since 2019.

He studied at Baku State University, Bachelor of Arts in International Relations in 1993-1997 and Master of Arts in International Relations in 1997-1999. In 1999, he began working in the Department of International Organizations of the Ministry of Foreign Affairs of the Republic of Azerbaijan.

In 2001-2003 he worked as the Third and the Second secretary of the Permanent Mission of Azerbaijan to the UN in New York, in 2003-2005 as the Second secretary of the Permanent Mission of Azerbaijan to NATO in Brussels, in 2005-2007 as the First secretary of the Department of Security Issues, and First Territorial (West) Department of the Ministry of Foreign Affairs of the Republic of Azerbaijan.

Jalal Mirzayev worked as the First secretary at the Embassy of Azerbaijan in Malaysia in 2007–2009, as Head of I European Division (United Kingdom  and Nordic countries) of the First Territorial (West) Department at the Ministry of Foreign Affairs of the Republic of Azerbaijan in 2009–2011, Counsellor at the Permanent Mission of Azerbaijan to the Council of Europe in 2011–2015, Deputy Head of Department of Americas at the Ministry of Foreign Affairs of the Republic of Azerbaijan in 2015-2017. He served as Chargé d'Affaires of the Republic of Azerbaijan in the Netherlands, as well as in the Organization for the Prohibition of Chemical Weapons from 2017 to September 27, 2019.

On September 27, 2019, he was appointed Ambassador Extraordinary and Plenipotentiary of the Republic of Azerbaijan to the Republic of Indonesia.

Foreign language skills are English, French and Russian.

See also 
Azerbaijan–Indonesia relations
Foreign relations of Azerbaijan

References

External links 

Official twitter profile of Ambassador Jalal Mirzayev
 Official linkedin profile of Ambassador Jalal Mirzayev

1977 births
Ambassadors of Azerbaijan to Indonesia
Living people
Azerbaijani diplomats